The 2020 Slovak Open was a professional tennis tournament played on indoor hard courts. It was the 21st edition of the tournament which was part of the 2020 ATP Challenger Tour. It took place in Bratislava, Slovakia between 9 and 15 November 2020.

Singles main-draw entrants

Seeds

 1 Rankings are as of 2 November 2020.

Other entrants
The following players received wildcards into the singles main draw:
  Lukáš Klein
  Jiří Lehečka
  Alex Molčan

The following player received entry into the singles main draw using a protected ranking:
  Maximilian Marterer

The following players received entry into the singles main draw as special exempts:
  Andrea Arnaboldi
  Quentin Halys

The following player received entry into the singles main draw as an alternate:
  Matteo Viola

The following players received entry from the qualifying draw:
  Mathias Bourgue
  Julian Lenz
  Tomáš Macháč
  Brayden Schnur

Champions

Singles

 Maximilian Marterer def.  Tomáš Macháč 6–7(3–7), 6–2, 7–5.

Doubles

 Harri Heliövaara /  Emil Ruusuvuori def.  Lukáš Klein /  Alex Molčan 6–4, 6–3.

References

2020 ATP Challenger Tour
2020
2020 in Slovak tennis
November 2020 sports events in Europe